Wallumbilla railway station is a disused station located on the Western line in Queensland, Australia. It serves the town of Wallumbilla. The station has one platform.

History 
The station opened in 1879.

On 1 December 1956, The Westlander collided head-on with the Western Mail which was stationary at Wallumbilla station. The crash killed 5 people and injured 11 or 13 people. There is a memorial at the railway station commemorating the crash.

Services
Wallumbilla was served by Queensland Rail Travel's twice weekly Westlander service travelling between Brisbane and Charleville until 2002. It is still a booked stop, with passengers required to alight at the preceding station (Yuleba) for road transport.

References

External links

Wallumbilla station Queensland's Railways on the Internet

Disused railway stations in Queensland
Maranoa Region
Railway stations in Australia opened in 1879
Western railway line, Queensland